The grey longbill (Macrosphenus concolor) is a species of Old World warbler in the family Macrosphenidae.
It is found in Angola, Benin, Cameroon, Central African Republic, Republic of the Congo, Democratic Republic of the Congo, Ivory Coast, Equatorial Guinea, Gabon, Ghana, Guinea, Liberia, Nigeria, Sierra Leone, Tanzania, Togo, and Uganda.
Its natural habitat is subtropical or tropical moist lowland forests.

References

grey longbill
Birds of the Gulf of Guinea
Birds of Sub-Saharan Africa
grey longbill
Taxonomy articles created by Polbot